Paula de Waart (1 January 1876 – 2 December 1938) was a Dutch film actress of the silent era. She appeared in 24 films between 1915 and 1935.

Filmography

 Het Mysterie van de Mondscheinsonate (1935)
 The Man in the Background (1922)
 De jantjes (1922)
 Schakels (1920)
 De damescoupeur (1919)
 Een Carmen van het Noorden (1919)
 Het goudvischje (1919)
 Amerikaansche meisjes (1918)
 Oorlog en vrede - 1918 (1918)
 Op hoop van zegen (1918)
 Oorlog en vrede - 1916 (1918)
 Oorlog en vrede - 1914 (1918)
 Toen 't licht verdween (1918)
 De kroon der schande (1918)
 Ulbo Garvema (1917)
 Gouden ketenen (1917)
 Madame Pinkette & Co (1917)
 Het geheim van Delft (1917)
 La renzoni (1916)
 Majoor Frans (1916)
 Liefdesoffer (1916)
 Vogelvrij (1916)
 Liefdesstrijd (1915)
 Koningin Elisabeth's dochter (1915)

References

External links

1876 births
1938 deaths
Dutch stage actresses
Dutch film actresses
Dutch silent film actresses
People from Vlissingen
20th-century Dutch actresses